Van Siclen Avenue may refer to the following stations of the New York City Subway in Brooklyn:

Van Siclen Avenue (BMT Jamaica Line), serving the 
Van Siclen Avenue (BMT Fulton Street Line), a former elevated station; now demolished
Van Siclen Avenue (IND Fulton Street Line), serving the 
Van Siclen Avenue (IRT New Lots Line), serving the 
Neptune Avenue (IND Culver Line), formerly Van Sicklen; serving the